Gul Circle (or Gul) is an area in Jurong Industrial Estate which is the biggest industrial estate in Singapore. Gul is the home to many heavy industries in Singapore. It is bounded by Ayer Rajah Expressway (Jalan Ahmad Ibrahim), Benoi Road, Pioneer Road and Tuas Road. Tuas Fire Station is located at Gul as well.

The area is known as Tanjong Gul in the old maps of Singapore.

Transport
Gul is served by SBS Transit industrial service 255 which links Gul to Joo Koon Bus Interchange and Joo Koon MRT station except Gul Road which is located in Pioneer Sector is served by industrial service 257 which also goes to Joo Koon Bus Interchange.

The below bus services run on the roads that form the boundary of Gul: 254 and 257 ply Benoi Road and Pioneer Road, 192 and 193 ply Jalan Ahmad Ibrahim and Tuas Road.

All the bus services above links the area to Joo Koon MRT station.

Gul Circle MRT station, which is located along Tuas Road, was opened on 18 June 2017. The MRT station opens simultaneously with the other stations of the East West line Tuas West Extension.

Neighbouring Areas

References

Places in Singapore
West Region, Singapore
Western Water Catchment